KCOT is a radio station on 96.3 FM in Cotulla, Texas. It is owned by José Antonio Aguilar, through licensee First FM Cotulla LLC, and carries La Mejor Regional Mexican format from MVS Radio.

History
KCOT was licensed in 2009 and received its callsign in January 2011. It was owned by KM Communications and promptly sold to its current owner before even coming to air.

KCOT holds a construction permit to become a Class C3 station with 25 kW ERP from a  tower.

External links

Radio stations established in 2012
COT (FM)
2012 establishments in Texas
COT (FM)